Haddon Heights Junior/Senior High School, previously known as Haddon Heights High School (HHHS), is a six-year comprehensive public middle school / high school that serves students in seventh through twelfth grades from Haddon Heights, in Camden County, New Jersey, United States, operating as part of the Haddon Heights School District. The school also serves students from the neighboring communities of Barrington, Lawnside and Merchantville (starting in the 2015–16 school year), who attend the high school for grades 9–12 as part of sending/receiving relationships.

History
The first graduating class in June 1903 included students from Audubon. The high school's current Tudor Gothic-style building, constructed at a cost of $500,000 (equivalent to $ million in ) opened in September 1924.

In September 1960, students from Magnolia, Somerdale and Stratford left the high school to start attending the new Sterling High School.

In 1992, the borough of Merchantville, which at the time was sending students to Pennsauken High School in Pennsauken Township as part of a longstanding sending/receiving relationship with the Pennsauken Public Schools, made plans to switch its high school students to Haddon Heights High, but the New Jersey Commissioner of Education did not allow these plans to go forward. In 2012, the board of the Merchantville School District decided to send its students to Haddon Heights High. The Haddon Heights district approved a plan in September 2013; it would add nearly 80 students a year from Merchantville to the high school, in addition to the average of more than 260 students from Barrington and 120 from Lawnside that are sent to Haddon Heights each year. The plan was approved by the Commissioner of the New Jersey Department of Education, and students from Merchantville began attending the school in September 2015. Students from Merchantville already in high school before 2015 will continue to attend Pennsauken High until their graduation. Scott Strong, the chief administrator of the Merchantville district, stated that "Haddon Heights offers the right programs, the right diversity and really met our needs."

Demographics
As of the 2021–22 school year, the school had an enrollment of 1,038 students and 81.3 classroom teachers (on an FTE basis), for a student–teacher ratio of 12.8:1. There were 136 students (13.1% of enrollment) eligible for free lunch and 14 (1.3% of students) eligible for reduced-cost lunch.

Awards, recognition and rankings
The school was the 207th-ranked public high school in New Jersey out of 339 schools statewide in New Jersey Monthly magazine's September 2014 cover story on the state's "Top Public High Schools", using a new ranking methodology. The school had been ranked 151st in the state of 328 schools in 2012, after being ranked 129th in 2010 out of 322 schools listed. The magazine ranked the school 168th in 2008 out of 316 schools. The school was ranked 135th in the magazine's September 2006 issue, which surveyed 316 schools across the state. Schooldigger.com ranked the school 159th out of 381 public high schools statewide in its 2011 rankings (an increase of 69 positions from the 2010 ranking) which were based on the combined percentage of students classified as proficient or above proficient on the mathematics (84.0%) and language arts literacy (91.8%) components of the High School Proficiency Assessment (HSPA).

Athletics
The Haddon Heights High School Garnets compete in the Colonial Conference, which is comprised of public high schools in Camden and Gloucester counties operating under the supervision of the New Jersey State Interscholastic Athletic Association (NJSIAA). With 657 students in grades 10–12, the school was classified by the NJSIAA for the 2022–24 school years as Group II South for most athletic competition purposes. The football team competes in the Constitution Division of the 94-team West Jersey Football League superconference and was classified by the NJSIAA as Group II South for football for 2022–2024.

Basketball

Boys 
The boys' basketball team took advantage of the height of its players to win the Group II state championship in 1970, defeating Union Hill High School by a score of 65–58 in the tournament final played at Convention Hall in Atlantic City.

Girls 
The girls' basketball team won the 2007 South, Group II state sectional championship with a 33–26 win against Cinnaminson High School.

Soccer 
The boys' team won the Group II state title in 1974, defeating Verona High School in the tournament championship game, and won the Group I state title in 2012, winning by a score of 3–0 against Harrison High School in the tournament final in a game played at The College of New Jersey.

Track and field 
The boys track team won the Group III spring track state championship in 1947, 1949, 1958, 1962–1964, won the Group II title in 1975, and won the Group I title in 1990–1992. The program's 10 state championships are tied for seventh-most in the state.

The girls team won the Group II spring track state championship in 1980 and 2007 (tied with Hanover Park High School), and the Group I title in 1991.

The girls track team and the boys team both won the Group II indoor state championship in 2006.

The girls track team won the Group I indoor relay championship in 2006

Field hockey 
The team won the South Jersey Group II state sectional championship in 1985.

Cross country 
The boys cross country team won the Group I state championship in 1992 and 2007. The 1991 boys team finished a perfect season of 11–0 for the first time in 17 years, won the South sectional title and finished second in the state meet. The 1992 boys' team won the South sectional title and won the Group I state championship for the first time in the school's history. The 2007 team claimed the South Jersey Group I sectional title; they also claimed the Group I state title.

Softball 
The softball team won the Group II state championship in 2001 (defeating Pompton Lakes High School in the final game of the tournament) and the Group I championship in 2013 (vs. Saddle Brook High/Middle School).

In 2001, the team won their second consecutive South, Group II state sectional championship with a 2–0 win against Manchester Township High School and went on to win the Group II state title, the program's first, with a 2–0 win against Pompton Lakes.

The 2013 team won the Group I state title with a 5–3 win against Saddle Brook in the championship game.

Baseball 
The team won the South Jersey Group I state sectional championship in 2015 with a 3–1 win against fifth-seeded Wildwood High School.

Extracurricular activities

Marching band:

The marching band was Tournament of Bands Atlantic Coast Champions in Group 1 in 1994. They were also the TOB Chapter 1 Champions in Group 1 from 1992–1997.

The school's marching band finished in third place at the 2007 United States Scholastic Band Association National Championships, competing as a Group I band at M&T Bank Stadium in Baltimore, Maryland on November 16, 2007, with a score of 94.175, missing second place by 1/20th of a point.

At the USSBA Yamaha Cup competition in October 2012, the marching band came in first in the 1 Open group, winning awards for Best Visual and Best Guard.

In November 2013, at MetLife Stadium in East Rutherford, the unit took home their first ever USBands Group 1 Open National Championship, with a score of 90.25.

The following season (2014), the unit went undefeated in the regular season in both the USBands and Tournament of Bands circuits. They proceeded to go a combined 4–1 in their championship performances in both circuits (the only loss being the Atlantic Coast Championships where they finished third). The unit won their second consecutive national championship, scoring a 94.450, over a four point improvement from the previous season’s national championship victory.

During the 2015 campaign, the unit won the Tournament of Bands Group 1 Open New Jersey State Championship at Toms River High School North, on October 24, 2015.

The 2018 season saw the unit take home their first USBands Group 1 Open New Jersey State Championship since the 2014 season, taking down the defending national champion in Burlington City High School, after going 0–2 when seeing them in the regular season.

Following the 2018 season, the unit lost 14 of its 35 total members, leaving the unit with only three senior members on the roster entering the 2019 season. Despite this, the unit went on to have by far their most successful season since the 2014 season, highlighted by taking home their second consecutive USBands Group 1 Open New Jersey State Championship, again defeating the defending national champion (again being Burlington). The championships were held at Wayne Valley High School on November 3, 2019.

On November 12, 2022, the marching unit won their first ever Cavalcade of Bands Independence Open Championship with a score of 96.10. This victory earned Rob Renninger, the unit’s longtime and heavily respected director, his fourth major championship win of his storied fifty-one year career (‘94, ‘13, ‘14).

Color guard:

The school's indoor color guard, known as High Voltage (or HV for short), was the Scholastic Open Class champions at the Tournament Indoor Association (TIA) All-Chapter Championships in 1994 and 1996.

High Voltage was WGI (Winter Guard International) finalists in the years 2000, 2001, 2003, 2005, and 2006. They finished as high as 6th place in both 2005 and 2006.

They were the Scholastic World Class Champions from 1998–2001, the Independent Open Class Champions in 2005 and 2006, and the Independent A Class Champions in 2002, 2004, 2007, 2008, and 2009. Their run from 1998–2009, in which they won an All-Chapter championship in 11 out of 12 seasons, is widely regarded as the best championship run in TIA history.

They were the Independent A Class Champions in the MAIN circuit in 2004, 2005, and 2009.

High Voltage was also 2014 USBands Indoor Color Guard Scholastic 3A champions.

Indoor percussion ensemble:

The school's indoor percussion ensemble was the Tournament Indoor Association Scholastic A Champions in 2006.

The school's indoor percussion ensemble also attended the 2007 and 2008 WGI (Winter Guard International) World Championships in Dayton, Ohio.

In 2008, the percussion ensemble was the 2008 Tournament Indoor Association Scholastic Open All Chapter Champions performing their award-winning show entitled, Illusions.

In 2011, at the Tournament Indoor Association Atlantic Coast Championships, the percussion ensemble won the Scholastic Intermediate A Prelims round with a score of 92.500, yet in just after two days in their finals performance, they jumped to a 97.975, becoming the 2011 Scholastic Intermediate A Atlantic Coast Champions.

In 2014, the percussion ensemble won the Scholastic Novice Atlantic Coast Championship, earning their fourth title in nine seasons.

Administration
The school's principal is Karim Fisher. His core administration team includes two assistant principals and the athletic director.

Notable alumni

 Tommy Avallone (born , class of 2001), film director and producer.
 Sarah K. Elfreth (born 1988, class of 2006), member of the Maryland Senate representing the 30th district, comprising Annapolis and southern Anne Arundel County.
 Ray Fisher (born 1988) actor in 2008 short film The Good, the Bad, and the Confused and Cyborg in Batman v Superman: Dawn of Justice
 Kristin Hunter (1931–2008), author best known for her first novel, God Bless the Child, published in 1964
 Steve Israel (born 1969), former football cornerback who played nine seasons in NFL
 Jeff Jones (born 1957), baseball player who played in MLB for the Cincinnati Reds
 Herb Kelleher (1931–2019), co-founder, Chairman and former CEO of Southwest Airlines
 Bill Manlove (born 1933, class of 1951), National Champion football coach at Widener University, member of College Football Hall of Fame
 Walter E. Pedersen (1911–1998, class of 1929), union leader and politician who served as Mayor of Clementon and a two-year term in the New Jersey General Assembly.
 Haason Reddick (born 1994), football linebacker selected 13th overall in 2017 NFL Draft by Arizona Cardinals
 Bo Wood (born 1945), former American football player and high school coach, who played in the NFL for the Atlanta Falcons.

References

External links 

Haddon Heights School District Website

School Data for the Haddon Heights School District, National Center for Education Statistics
South Jersey Sports: Haddon Heights HS

Haddon Heights, New Jersey
Barrington, New Jersey
Lawnside, New Jersey
Merchantville, New Jersey
1910 establishments in New Jersey
Public middle schools in New Jersey
Public high schools in Camden County, New Jersey
Educational institutions established in 1910